Dan Dugmore is an American session musician known primarily for playing the pedal steel guitar

Born in 1949, Dugmore was raised in Pasadena, California. Influenced by the Flying Burrito Brothers, he learned to play steel guitar after Flying Burrito Brothers member Sneaky Pete Kleinow sold him one. Dugmore then joined John Stewart's road band, and then Linda Ronstadt's; he also played for several James Taylor albums. In the 1990s, he moved to Nashville, Tennessee, where he began playing steel guitar on country music albums. He self-released a Beatles cover album in 2003 titled Off White Album.

Dugmore also plays Dobro, electric guitar, acoustic guitar, banjo and mandolin.

He has played as session musician with David Crosby, Don Henley, Dusty Springfield, Graham Nash, Jake Owen, James Taylor, Karla Bonoff, Kenny Loggins, Kenny Rogers, Kid Rock, Lauren Alaina, Linda Ronstadt, Lionel Richie, Olivia Newton-John, Randy Travis, Ronnie Milsap, Sheryl Crow, Stevie Nicks, Tim McGraw, Warren Zevon, The Mountain Goats, John Prine, Wilson Phillips and ZZ Top among others.

References

External links

1940s births
American country guitarists
American male guitarists
American multi-instrumentalists
Pedal steel guitarists
Musicians from Pasadena, California
Resonator guitarists
American session musicians
Living people
Guitarists from California
20th-century American guitarists
Country musicians from California
20th-century American male musicians